A shoe phone is a shoe that has a telephone within it. Though there is no specific evidence that spies or those involved in espionage actually used shoe phones, they were popularised by fictional spies in television shows, most notably the television series Get Smart. Modern mobile phone technology has allowed for the development and production of working shoe phones.

In espionage

Though the shoe phone was popularised by fictional television and film "spies", there is no specific evidence that functional, operating shoe phones were given to actual spies. It is not clear whether the technology required to create a working shoe phone was available and practical during the height of the Cold War, the era on which many fictional representations are based.

A shoe phone of the sort depicted by Get Smart would almost certainly not have been possible in the era depicted by the show (1960s and 70s). When the Central Intelligence Agency announced that one of Don Adams' prop shoe phones would be placed on display at the CIA Museum, the agency dismissed any link to actual spy equipment and said shoe phones and other such gadgets were, "but fantasy precursors to today’s wireless communications".

Get Smart

The most famous example of a shoe phone in fiction is featured on the television show Get Smart. The use of a shoe phone is a gimmick of the show's main character, Maxwell Smart (played by Don Adams), a secret agent who has need to conceal a communication device in his shoe. 

The device had a removable sole which allowed access to a telephone handset. Like many gadgets depicted in the series, the shoe phone was a parody of communication gadgets in James Bond films, which were themselves often fantastical.

Sneaker phone

In the 1990s, Sports Illustrated developed and promoted a "Sneaker Phone", a sports shoe that included a (corded) phone. The company began a television campaign to promote a special deal whereby consumers who subscribed to their magazine received a free Sneaker Phone. The product was created for Sports Illustrated by Kinetic Marketing Inc., a firm known for creating promotional products for large magazines throughout the 1980s and 1990s.

References

Further reading
 'Get Smart' shoe phone a reality | Entertainment | Eugene News, Weather, Sports, Breaking News | KVAL CBS 13
 Shoe phone talks the talk, walks the walk - CNET
 Aussie boffin cobbles together Get Smart shoe phone - Technology - smh.com.au
 BBC News - Cell your sole: Designer tests 'shoe phone' concept

Telephony equipment
Uses of shoes